Larmer Bay ruin is a ruin in Larmer Bay, on the north side of Tortola in the British Virgin Islands. The ruin dates from the sugar plantation era, and was presumed abandoned during the economic collapse of the British Virgin Islands during the mid-19th century.

The ruins are difficult to access, as no roads lead down to the bay, and the ghuts leading down the mountain side are relatively steep. The bay is not accessible by sea due to the coral reefs lying close to the shore, and the strong north side swells. However, a road from the nearby housing development descends to within a couple of hundred feet of the bay, and a dirt track leads down to the beach, making it possible to see the ruins without cutting a path.

The ruin has never been academically studied, and there is almost no historical record of the ruin. It is presumed to be one of the many relatively impoverished sugar plantations that fell into financial distress after the United Kingdom passed the Sugar Duties Act 1846, and was most likely abandoned after the insurrection of 1853.

The ruin is one of the largest (if not the largest) plantation era ruin surviving in the British Virgin Islands. Remains of copper vats and grinding equipment can still be seen on the site.

Images

References 

Ruins in the British Virgin Islands
History of the British Virgin Islands
Tortola